Čelopek may refer to:

Čelopek, Brvenica, Republic of North Macedonia
Čelopek, Zvornik, Bosnia and Herzegovina
Čelopek, Lipljan, a populated place in Kosovo
Čelopek, Staro Nagoričane, Municipality of Staro Nagoričane, Republic of North Macedonia
Chelopek, Bulgaria

See also
Fight on Čelopek (1905), between Serbian and Ottoman forces
Čelo (disambiguation)
Chelopek